John Bailey Hawkes (7 June 1899 – 31 March 1990) was an Australian tennis player who won the singles title at the 1926 Australasian Championships and was ranked No. 10 in the world in 1928.

Biography
Hawkes was raised and lived his life in and around Geelong, Victoria. Educated at The Geelong College from 1909 to 1919, he showed enormous potential as a young sportsman, having won the Victorian School Boys U19 tennis title for 5 years in a row – described by historian Graeme Kinross Smith as the "nursery for tennis talent". Hawkes had also been touted as a future test cricketer for Australia and was made a member of the MCC at the age of 13.  He was captain of the first Cricket team for the last 4 years of his school life at The Geelong College and according to school website, "In a legendary day of bowling in 1916, Jack Hawkes was to claim 10 wickets in a match against Wesley College." Tennis, however, was to create a more powerful pull than cricket. Taught on the lawn court at the family home "Llanberis", overlooking Corio Bay by family friend Russell Keays and influenced by tennis legend and family friend, Norman Brookes, Jack's career blossomed in the 1920s.  The left-hander won a clean sweep at the Australasian Championships of 1926, winning the men's singles, men's doubles and mixed doubles in the same year. Hawkes had five championship points in a marathon singles final against his doubles partner Gerald Patterson in the Australian Championships in 1927, but went on to lose the match in five sets. Hawkes also won two US mixed doubles titles, won a total of three Australian doubles titles with Gerald Patterson and was runner-up with Gerald Patterson in Wimbledon doubles and US doubles of 1928. Hawkes also won a total of three mixed doubles Australian championships.

Hawkes was a three-times Davis Cup representative in 1921, 1923, 1925 and was controversially omitted from the team in the year of his Australian Open crown in 1926 and successful overseas tour of 1928.  After his retirement from tennis, Hawkes was actively involved in tennis administration and ran the family business Hawkes Brothers, in Geelong until his retirement in the early 1970s. Jack Hawkes retired to Ocean Grove (where he had holidayed as a child at the family's beachside home "Imbool"), and later to Barwon Heads before his death in Geelong, at the age of 90 after a short illness, on 31 March 1990. He was survived by his wife Mickey and their four children; Ann, Sally, Sue and John.

Grand Slam finals

Singles: 2 (1 title, 1 runner-up)

Doubles: 7 (3 titles, 4 runners-up)

Mixed doubles: 7 (5 titles, 2 runners-up)

References

External links
 Bud Collins: Total Tennis – The Ultimate Tennis Encyclopedia (2003 Edition).
 
 
 

1899 births
1990 deaths
Australasian Championships (tennis) champions
Australian male tennis players
Sportspeople from Geelong
Tennis people from Victoria (Australia)
United States National champions (tennis)
Grand Slam (tennis) champions in men's singles
Grand Slam (tennis) champions in mixed doubles
Grand Slam (tennis) champions in men's doubles
19th-century Australian people
20th-century Australian people